also called Morozumi Bingono Kami Torasada(諸角豊後守) was a Japanese samurai and commander of the Sengoku period. He served the Takeda clan.

In 1561, he participated in the Battle of Kawanakajima, He fought bravely and was killed. It is said that Torasada was 81 years old at the time.

In fiction
Ten to Chi to (Taiga drama, 1969), played by Kunishirō Hayashi.
Fūrin Kazan (Taiga drama, 2007), played by Takeshi Katō.

References

Samurai
Takeda clan
1561 deaths
1480 births